Asa Packer (December 29, 1805May 17, 1879) was an American businessman who pioneered railroad construction, was active in Pennsylvania politics, and founded Lehigh University. He was a conservative and religious man who reflected the image of the typical Connecticut Yankee. He served two terms in the United States House of Representatives (1853–1857).

Early life
Packer was born in Mystic, Connecticut in 1805. He moved to Pennsylvania, where he became a carpenter's apprentice to his cousin Edward Packer at Brooklyn Township, Pennsylvania, which is located on the Pennsylvania-New York border. He also worked seasonally as a carpenter in New York City and later in Springville Township, Pennsylvania to the south of Brooklyn Township; he met his wife Sarah Minerva Blakslee there. 

Yates writes of his early life: "Asa and Sarah settled on a farm, and in the winter he went to Tunkhannock on the Susquehanna and used his skill in carpentry to build and repair canal boats." This continued for 11 years. In 1833, Packer settled at Mauch Chunk (today's Jim Thorpe), where he became the owner of a canal boat carrying coal to Philadelphia. He then established the firm of A. & R. W. Packer, which built canal boats and locks for the Lehigh Coal & Navigation Company.

Business activities
Packer urged the Lehigh Coal & Navigation Company to adopt a steam railway as a coal carrier, but the project was not then considered feasible. In 1851, he became the major stockholder of the Delaware, Lehigh, Schuylkill & Susquehanna Railroad Company, which became the Lehigh Valley Railroad Company in January 1853, and they built a railway line from Mauch Chunk to Easton between November 1852 and September 1855. Construction commenced on the Mauch Chunk-Easton line just as Packer's five year charter was to expire. He built railways connecting the main line with coal mines in Luzerne and Schuylkill counties, and he planned and built the extension of the line into the Susquehanna Valley and thence into New York state to connect at Waverly with the Erie Railroad. Among his clerks and associates during this period was future businessman and soldier George Washington Helme.

Politics
Packer also took an active part in politics. In 1842–1843, he was a member of the Pennsylvania House of Representatives.  In 1843–1844, he was county judge of Carbon County under Governor David R. Porter.  He served two terms as a Democratic member of the U.S. House of Representatives beginning in 1853. Packer made an unsuccessful bid for the Democratic Party's Presidential nomination in 1868.  He got the party's nod for the 1869 Pennsylvania Governor's race, but lost the campaign to John W. Geary by 4,596 votes, one of the closest statewide races in Pennsylvania history.

Lehigh University
Packer endeavored to found a university in the Lehigh Valley. The final spot chosen was on South Mountain in Bethlehem, Pennsylvania. The location coincided a Moravians religious community and eventually end up coinciding with the home of Bethlehem Steel. In 1865, Packer gave $500,000 and 60 acres (243,000 m²), later increased to 115 acres (465,000 m²), for the establishment of a technical trade school for engineers. Lehigh University was chartered, and instruction began in 1866. The first main building, Packer Hall, was completed in 1869. With Packer's generosity, Lehigh was able to offer education tuition free for its first 20 years, 1871–1891, before economic troubles in the 1890s forced the University to reverse this policy.

After the initial gift of one half million dollars, Packer continued to support the university and he took an active role in its management. His will bequeathed $1,500,000 as an endowment for the university, $500,000 to the university library, and granted the university an interest of nearly one third in his estate upon its final distribution.

Family
Packer was married to Sarah Minerva Blakslee (1807–1882), daughter to Zophar and Clarinda Whitmer Blakslee.  The Packers had seven children: Lucy Packer Linderman (1832–1873), Catherine Packer (1836–1837), Mary Packer Cummings (1839–1912), Malvina Fitzrandolph Packer (1841–1841), Robert Asa Packer (1842–1883), Gertrude Packer (1846–1848), and Harry Eldred Packer (1850–1884).

Legacies

Packer's residence, Asa Packer Mansion, became a museum, opened for tours in 1956, and was named a National Historic Landmark in 1985. Packer was a member of St. Mark's Episcopal Church in Jim Thorpe, Pennsylvania and contributed large amounts of money to this beautiful Gothic Revival Church. St. Mark's was declared a National Historic Landmark in 1987. There is also an elementary school in Bethlehem, Pennsylvania named after Packer. Lehigh University continues to honor him with a large portrait by Charles A. Boutelle and an annual celebration of Founder's Day. A life-sized bronze by Karel Mikolas, donated by the Lehigh University Class of 2003 and dedicated in 2008, stands outside Lehigh University's Alumni Memorial Building.

See also
List of railroad executives

References

 
 
The Asa Packer Mansion Museum.
Asa Packer at The Political Graveyard
 Retrieved on 2009-03-24

External links
Asa Packer letters and ephemera. Available online through Lehigh University's I Remain: A Digital Archive of Letters, Manuscripts, and Ephemera.

1805 births
1879 deaths
19th-century American railroad executives
Lehigh University people
American Civil War industrialists
Candidates in the 1868 United States presidential election
University and college founders
People from Jim Thorpe, Pennsylvania
Democratic Party members of the United States House of Representatives from Pennsylvania
People from Susquehanna County, Pennsylvania
People from Mystic, Connecticut
19th-century American Episcopalians
19th-century American politicians
Lehigh Valley Railroad people